Idridgehay and Alton is a civil parish in the English county of Derbyshire. The population of the civil parish taken at the 2011 Census was 275.

Idridgehay and Alton forms part of the non-metropolitan district of Amber Valley. Its principal settlements are the village of Idridgehay and the hamlets of Alton, Idridgehay Green and Ireton Wood.
  The Ecclesbourne Valley Railway line runs parallel to the parish.

See also
Listed buildings in Idridgehay and Alton

External links

References

Civil parishes in Derbyshire